Developmentally-regulated GTP-binding protein 1 is a protein that in humans is encoded by the DRG1 gene.

References

Further reading